Park Ui-sung (born 27 September 2000) is a South Korean tennis player. He has a career-high ranking of No. 635 achieved on 12 September 2022.

Park has a career high ITF junior combined ranking of No. 3 achieved on 1 January 2018.

Challenger and World Tennis Tour Finals

Singles: 1 (0-1)

External links

2000 births
Living people
South Korean male tennis players
Tennis players from Seoul
21st-century South Korean people